Coleophora sabaea is a moth of the family Coleophoridae. It is found in Yemen.

The wingspan is about 10.5 mm.

References

sabaea
Moths of the Arabian Peninsula
Moths described in 2007